Brzezówka may refer to several villages in Poland:
Brzezówka, Kolbuszowa County in Subcarpathian Voivodeship (south-east Poland)
Brzezówka, Jasło County in Subcarpathian Voivodeship (south-east Poland)
Brzezówka, Ropczyce-Sędziszów County in Subcarpathian Voivodeship (south-east Poland)
Brzezówka, Rzeszów County in Subcarpathian Voivodeship (south-east Poland)
Brzezówka, Silesian Voivodeship (south Poland)
Brzezówka, Lesser Poland Voivodeship (south Poland)